Fernando Agostinho da Costa (born October 10, 1981 in Luanda) better known as Chara, is a retired Angolan football midfielder.

Xara has played for Petro Atlético since 2006 and has also been a member of the Angolan national football team since 2006 and has 17 caps for the team. He was not called up for the 2006 FIFA World Cup due to his lack of experience. But, he was called up for the 2010 African Nations Cup due to the injury to André Macanga.

External links

References

1984 births
Living people
Footballers from Luanda
Angolan footballers
Atlético Petróleos de Luanda players
C.R.D. Libolo players
Girabola players
Angola international footballers
2010 Africa Cup of Nations players
2011 African Nations Championship players
Association football midfielders
Angola A' international footballers